Matthew Timoko (born 18 January 2000) is a professional rugby league footballer who plays as a  for the Canberra Raiders in the NRL.

Background
Timoko was born in Auckland, New Zealand and is of Māori and Samoan descent.

Career

2020
Timoko made his NRL debut in round 16 of the 2020 NRL season for the Canberra against the Canterbury-Bankstown Bulldogs; he replaced an injured Curtis Scott in the 47th minute as the Canberra club won the game 34–20.

2021
Timoko played nine games for Canberra in the 2021 NRL season as the club finished 10th on the table.

2022
In round 3 of the 2022 NRL season, Timoko scored two tries for Canberra in their 24-22 victory over the Gold Coast.

References

External links
Raiders profile

2000 births
Living people
Canberra Raiders players
New Zealand sportspeople of Samoan descent
New Zealand Māori rugby league players
New Zealand rugby league players
Rugby league centres
Rugby league players from Auckland